Hymned Again is the second solo album from MercyMe singer Bart Millard. Like his previous effort, Hymned, No. 1, the album features modern takes on popular Christian hymns. The album was released on August 19, 2008. Country singer Vince Gill, again makes a collaboration on the song "Jesus Cares for Me". The album also features vocals by Christy Nockels (from Watermark).

Track listing

 "Stand Up, Stand Up for Jesus" (Duffield, Webb) - 2:59
 "What a Day That Will Be" (Hill) - 3:50
 "I Saw the Light" (Hank Williams) - 3:37
 "What a Friend We Have in Jesus" (Charles Converse, Joseph M. Scriven) - 3:41
 "I Stand Amazed" (featuring Christy Nockels) (Gabriel) - 4:04
 "Jesus Cares for Me" (featuring Vince Gill) (Cockrell, Millard) - 3:58
 "Victory in Jesus" (Bartlett) - 3:36
 "Brethren We Have Met to Worship" (Atkins, Moore) - 3:47
 "Leaning on the Everlasting Arms" (Hoffman, Showalter) - 3:05
 "Down at the Cross" (Hoffman, Stockton) - 4:05
 "Grace That Is Greater" (Johnston, Towner) - 2:59

Awards

Hymned Again was nominated for a Grammy Award for Best Southern, Country, or Bluegrass Gospel Album at the 51st Grammy Awards. It was also nominated for a Dove Award for Country Album of the Year at the 40th GMA Dove Awards.

Chart performance

The album peaked at #126 on Billboard 200 and #8 on Billboard's Christian Albums.

References

External links
Hymned Again at Amazon.com

2008 albums